Pervomayskaya (Berense may) is a rural locality (a village) and the administrative centre of Pervomaysky Selsoviet, Meleuzovsky District, Bashkortostan, Russia. The population was 764 as of 2010. There are 15 streets.

Geography 
Pervomayskaya is located 11 km southeast of Meleuz (the district's administrative centre) by road. Staromusino is the nearest rural locality.

References 

Rural localities in Meleuzovsky District